Ponzo is a surname. Notable people with the surname include:

 (1759–1791), Italian composer 
Mario Ponzo (1882–1960), Italian psychologist
Paolo Ponzo (1972–2013), Italian footballer
Rafael Ponzo (born 1978), Venezuelan footballer

Italian-language surnames